Donald Wallace may refer to:

 Donald Mackenzie Wallace (1841–1919), Scottish public servant, writer, editor and journalist
 Donald Smith Wallace (1844–1900), politician in Queensland, Australia
 Don Wallace (footballer) (1898–1968), Australian rules footballer
 Don Wallace (born 1940), American professional baseball player